Jolanta Siwińska (born 2 April 1991) is a Polish footballer who plays as a versatile defender of Górnik Łęczna.

Club career
She played for Pogoń Szczecin before moving to Germany. She joined Turbine on a two-year contract from FC Lübars in July 2015.

References

External links 
 
 Profile at Turbine Potsdam 
 Profile at German Football Association (DFB) 

1991 births
Living people
Polish women's footballers
1. FFC Turbine Potsdam players
Poland women's international footballers
Expatriate women's footballers in Germany
Polish expatriate footballers
Polish expatriate sportspeople in Germany
People from Kołobrzeg
Górnik Łęczna (women) players
Women's association football defenders
Sportspeople from West Pomeranian Voivodeship